The Waikato Sprint currently run as the BCD Group Sprint is a Group 1 Thoroughbred horse race run at Te Rapa Racecourse in Hamilton in early February.

It is currently held on the same day as the Group 1 Herbie Dykes Stakes.

The list of winners includes almost every top-class sprinter-miler to have raced in New Zealand in the last three decades, and is highlighted by the back-to-back victories by champion mare Sunline in 2001-02.

The well-performed gelding Mufhasa won the 2009 and 2011 events (also winning the Telegraph Handicap in both of these years) and was also 2nd in 2012 and 3rd in 2010.

Courier Bay won in both 1987 and 1988 but was unable to get a third win, running second by 1 1/4 lengths to the reigning Cox Plate winner, Poetic Prince, the following year.

Winners of the Waikato Sprint

See also

 Recent winners of major NZ sprint races
 Telegraph Handicap
 Railway Stakes
 Otaki-Maori Weight for Age
 Captain Cook Stakes

References

 N.Z. Thoroughbred Racing Inc.
 http://www.racenet.com.au
 http://www.nzracing.co.nz
 http://www.tab.co.nz
 http://www.racebase.co.nz
 The Great Decade of New Zealand racing 1970-1980. Glengarry, Jack. William Collins Publishers Ltd, Wellington, New Zealand.
 New Zealand Thoroughbred Racing Annual 2018 (47th edition). Dennis Ryan, Editor, Racing Media NZ Limited, Auckland, New Zealand.
 New Zealand Thoroughbred Racing Annual 2017 (46th edition). Dennis Ryan, Editor, Racing Media NZ Limited, Auckland, New Zealand.
 New Zealand Thoroughbred Racing Annual 2008 (37th edition). Bradford, David, Editor.  Bradford Publishing Limited, Paeroa, New Zealand.
 New Zealand Thoroughbred Racing Annual 2005 (34th edition). Bradford, David, Editor.  Bradford Publishing Limited, Paeroa, New Zealand.
 New Zealand Thoroughbred Racing Annual 2004 (33rd edition). Bradford, David, Editor.  Bradford Publishing Limited, Paeroa, New Zealand.
 New Zealand Thoroughbred Racing Annual 2000 (29th edition). Bradford, David, Editor.  Bradford Publishing Limited, Auckland, New Zealand.
 New Zealand Thoroughbred Racing Annual 1997  (26th edition). Dillon, Mike, Editor. Mike Dillon's Racing Enterprises Ltd, Auckland, New Zealand.
 New Zealand Thoroughbred Racing Annual 1995 (24th edition). Dillon, Mike, Editor. Mike Dillon's Racing Enterprises Ltd, Auckland, New Zealand.
 New Zealand Thoroughbred Racing Annual 1994 (23rd edition). Dillon, Mike, Editor. Meadowset Publishing, Auckland, New Zealand.
 New Zealand Thoroughbred Racing Annual 1991  (20th edition). Dillon, Mike, Editor. Moa Publications, Auckland, New Zealand.
 New Zealand Thoroughbred Racing Annual 1987 (16th edition). Dillon, Mike, Editor. Moa Publications, Auckland, New Zealand.
 New Zealand Thoroughbred Racing Annual 1985 (Fourteenth edition). Costello, John, Editor. Moa Publications, Auckland, New Zealand.
 New Zealand Thoroughbred Racing Annual 1984 (Thirteenth edition). Costello, John, Editor. Moa Publications, Auckland, New Zealand.
 New Zealand Thoroughbred Racing Annual 1982 (Eleventh edition). Costello, John, Editor. Moa Publications, Auckland, New Zealand.
 New Zealand Thoroughbred Racing Annual 1981 (Tenth edition). Costello, John, Editor. Moa Publications, Auckland, New Zealand.
 New Zealand Thoroughbred Racing Annual 1980 (Ninth edition). Costello, John, Editor. Moa Publications, Auckland, New Zealand.
 New Zealand Thoroughbred Racing Annual 1979 (Eighth edition).Costello, John, Editor. Moa Publications, Auckland, New Zealand.
 New Zealand Thoroughbred Racing Annual 1978 (Seventh edition).Costello, John, Editor. Moa Publications, Auckland, New Zealand.
 New Zealand Thoroughbred Racing Annual 1976. Costello, John, Editor. Moa Publications, Auckland.

Horse races in New Zealand
Open middle distance horse races